Dr Mu (1962 - 2014) was a hard trance DJ and record producer from London, England.

Biography 

Born in Strasbourg, France, under the name of Noël Fuchs, Dr Mu moved to London in the mid-80s, but it was not until the mid-90s that his music career took off. He was a resident DJ at Heaven and Turnmills, two major nightclubs in London, and a guest DJ across the UK and Europe. He carried on performing in more underground clubs almost until the end of his life.

Dr Mu also wrote his own music, released on several labels and remixed by various artists. His second single release, which sampled an Inuit folk tune by an elder from the town of Qaanaaq, Greenland, was acclaimed in the music press.

Discography 
 Be Silent Flip Records 1996
 Qaanaaq Opium Records 1996
 N.D.N. (2 versions) Metropolitan Music 1997
 Play With Me Enterpress Records 1997
 Tribal NRG / Bloody Sunday Enterpress Records 1998
 Be Silent (2 remixes) Metropolitan Music 1999
 Moontrigger (2 versions) with Mrs Wood Recharge 2001

References 

1962 births
2014 deaths
Club DJs
British DJs
Electronic dance music DJs